Cilla is the debut studio album by British singer Cilla Black, released on 25 January 1965 by Parlophone Records. The album was a commercial success, reaching No. 5 on the UK Albums Chart. The tracks were directed by John Scott, Johnnie Spence and George Martin. Sounds Incorporated accompany her on "Love Letters".

Re-release 
A mono sound edition of this album was re-issued on CD in 2002 by EMI Records with  Cilla Sings a Rainbow.

On 7 September 2009, EMI released a special edition of the album exclusively to digital download. This re-issue features all of the album's original recordings and four bonus tracks, re-mastered by Abbey Road Studios from original 1/4" stereo master tapes. A digital booklet containing original album artwork, detailed track information and rare photographs will be available from iTunes with purchases of the entire album re-issue.

Track listing

Personnel 
 Lead vocals by Cilla Black
 Produced by George Martin
 Album cover photograph by Roger Whitaker

Charts

References

Further reading

External links 
 CillaBlack.com Discography – Cilla
 EMI Music Official Site
 

1965 debut albums
Cilla Black albums
Parlophone albums
EMI Records albums
Albums produced by George Martin